Rico Puno may refer to:

 Rico E. Puno, Philippine technocrat
 Rico J. Puno (1953–2018), Philippine singer